{{Infobox song
| name       = Act a Fool
| cover      = Act_a_fool_cover.jpg
| alt        =
| type       = single
| artist     = Ludacris
| album      = 2 Fast 2 Furious (soundtrack) and Chicken-n-Beer (UK version)
| released   = May 20, 2003
| recorded   = 2002–2003
| studio     =
| venue      =
| genre      = Hip hop
| length     =
| label      = DTP, Def Jam
| writer     = Christopher Bridges, Keith McMasters
| producer   = Keith Mack
| chronology = Ludacris
| prev_title = Gossip Folks
| prev_year  = 2002
| next_title = P-Poppin
| next_year  = 2003
}}

"Act a Fool" is a single by Ludacris from the soundtrack for the 2003 film 2 Fast 2 Furious and his fourth album Chicken-n-Beer'' (UK version). It was nominated for the Grammy Award for Best Song Written for a Motion Picture, Television or Other Visual Media.

Charts

Weekly charts

Year-end charts

Certifications

References

External links

MTV Version

2003 singles
2003 songs
Def Jam Recordings singles
Ludacris songs
Music videos directed by Bryan Barber
Songs written by Ludacris
Fast & Furious music